Portimonense Sporting Clube, commonly known as Portimonense Basquetebol or simply Portimonense is a professional basketball team based in the city of Portimão, Portugal, that plays in the Proliga (Portugal) basketball league. It is a part of the Portimonense sports club. In 2020, the team guaranteed the promotion to Proliga, the second tier of the sport in Portugal. They obtained their first national title by triumphing in the final, played on July 4 in Barreiro, over Galitos de Aveiro by 71–62.

Achievements
Campeonato Nacional Basquetebol: 1
2020-21

Notable players

References

External links
  Official Website
  Zerozero

Basketball teams in Portugal